Cuspidal point can refer to:

 Cuspidal point of a curve, see Cusp (singularity)
 Cuspidal point of a surface, see Pinch point (mathematics)